Mica Levi (b. February 1987), also known by their stage name Micachu, is an English singer, songwriter, composer and producer. Levi is classically trained and since 2008 has released experimental pop music with their band Good Sad Happy Bad (formerly Micachu and the Shapes), including the critically praised debut album Jewellery in 2009.

In 2014, Levi branched out into film composing, creating the score for the Jonathan Glazer film Under the Skin. Their work was widely praised and Levi received a European Film Award for Best Composer and a BAFTA Award for Best Film Music nomination. Their score for Pablo Larraín's Jackie received an Academy Award nomination for Best Original Score.

Early life
Levi was born and raised in Surrey, England. and studied at the Purcell School for Young Musicians from the age of nine. Their father is a visiting professor of music at Royal Holloway, University of London, and their mother teaches cello. Their paternal grandmother is Romanian. Levi started writing and playing music at the age of four.

Music
Levi moved to London in their teens and performed as a DJ and released a mixtape titled Filthy Friends, which was posted on their official Myspace page. For Filthy Friends they enlisted the help of friends and musicians of various backgrounds including MCs Baker Trouble, Brother May, Man Like Me & Ghostpoet, singer-songwriter Jack Peñate, jazz band Troyka, London pop-band Golden Silvers as well as producers Kwes and Toddla T. Following its release, Filthy Friends became sought after on the London club scene.

While a student at Guildhall, Levi was commissioned to write an orchestral piece for the London Philharmonic Orchestra which was performed at the Royal Festival Hall in April 2008.

Levi was an Artist-in-Residence at the Southbank Centre in London in 2010.

Levi co-wrote and produced Tirzah's I'm Not Dancing EP, which was released by Greco-Roman Records in August 2013, to critical acclaim.

Levi contributed to the soundtrack for Phil Collins' Ceremony at Manchester International Festival 2017.

The Shapes / Good Sad Happy Bad

Levi formed a band called Micachu and the Shapes, which included Raisa Khan on keyboards and Marc Pell on drums. They signed to Accidental Records. With the Shapes, Levi's focus was experimental pop music. Most of the music prominently featured an acoustic half-guitar with various non-standard tunings, extensive distortion, and use of noise and found-object elements, as well as occasionally unusual time signatures. Despite these experimental leanings, the artist categorizes their output with the Shapes as "pop music."

Their debut album, Jewellery, produced with electronic musician Matthew Herbert, was recorded around Levi's composition studies at Guildhall School. In the wake of growing buzz, Micachu and the Shapes were signed to Rough Trade, which released Jewellery on 9 March 2009 to critical praise. The band performed with the London Sinfonietta at Kings Place, London, in May 2010, and in March 2011 released the live recording as the album Chopped and Screwed. The follow-up to their debut, Never, was released on 23 July 2012. The band then released the album Good Sad Happy Bad on 11 September 2015.

In March 2016, the band announced on social media that they were changing their name to Good Sad Happy Bad. The band then expanded to a four-piece, adding multi-instrumentalist and producer CJ Calderwood and Raisa Khan becoming the band's lead vocalist.

Film scores 
Levi's first major film score was for Jonathan Glazer's 2014 film Under the Skin. The film is based on the novel of the same name by Michel Faber and stars Scarlett Johansson. Produced at age 26 and created in collaboration with Glazer, Levi's film score themes are so tightly woven into the film that they give a symbiotic quality, in which the aural feels inseparable from the visual. The score was widely acclaimed for pushing the boundaries of music and sound design and Levi was nominated for multiple awards. They won Best Composer at the 2014 European Film Awards, and tied with Jonny Greenwood for Best Music/Score at the 2014 Los Angeles Film Critics Awards. They were also nominated for the 2015 BAFTA Award for Best Film Music.

In 2016, Levi completed their second major film score, for Pablo Larraín's Jacqueline Kennedy Onassis biopic Jackie. Larraín had been a juror at the 2013 Venice Film Festival, and thought that Under the Skin deserved a film score prize. Composer Ryuichi Sakamoto, also on the jury, was enthralled by Levi's bold score for the film, and he and Larraín spoke passionately of their accomplishment, which led to the collaboration on Jackie. Levi was nominated for Best Original Score at the 89th Academy Awards, making them the fifth non-male nominated in the category, but lost to Justin Hurwitz for La La Land.

Levi's third major film score was for the 2017 science-fiction film Marjorie Prime and their fourth was for the 2019 film Monos. In December 2019, it was announced they would be writing the score for the dark-comedy thriller film Zola.

In 2020 Levi composed the score for Mangrove, the first, feature-length episode of Steve McQueen's Small Axe series for the BBC/Amazon.

Personal life 
In December 2020, Levi came out as non-binary.

Discography

Studio albums

Live albums

Mixtapes

Singles / EPs
 "Golden Phone" (2008)
 "Lips" (2009)
 "Turn Me Well" (2009)
 "I'm Not Dancing" (2013) (with Tirzah)
 "No Romance" (2014) (with Tirzah)
 "Thinking of You" (2015) (with Nozinja, Tirzah and Mumdance)
 "Make It Up" (2015) (with Tirzah)
 "Taz and May Vids" (2016) (with Tirzah and Brother May)
 "Looking Up at the Sun / Mash One" (2016) (with Good Sad Happy Bad)
 "Clothes Wear Me" (2016) (with KEVIN)
 "Delete Beach" (2017)
 "Obviously" (2018) (with Tirzah as Taz & Meeks)
 "Skunk Boy." (2022)

Production

As featured artist
 Speech Debelle - "Better Days" (2009)
 Babyfather - "God Hour" (2016)
 Arca - "Think Of" and "Baby Doll" (2016)
 Mount Kimbie - "Marilyn" (2017)
 Stubborn - Mid (2020)
 Bar Italia - 	letting go makes it stay (2021)

Awards and recognition

References

External links
 Micachu website
 Accidental Records profile
 BBC newsbeat: Is Micachu the next big thing?
 Michachu page at Rough Trade Records
 Interview - December 2009 -(Portuguese web-zine) 
 Micachu vs Kwake Bass "Meat Batch Mix" on Andrew Meza's BTS Radio
 Interview with Mica Levi on Headphone Commute, December 2014
 

1987 births
Living people
21st-century English singers
21st-century British guitarists
British alternative rock musicians
British people of Romanian descent
English experimental musicians
English film score composers
English record producers
English guitarists
European Film Award for Best Composer winners
People educated at Purcell School
People from Surrey
Singers from London
Non-binary musicians
Transgender composers